is a railway station on the Sekihoku Main Line in Bihoro, Hokkaido, Japan, operated by Hokkaido Railway Company (JR Hokkaido).

Lines
It is numbered "A65".

Station layout
The station consists of one side platform and one island platform serving two tracks (platforms 2 and 3), as the track at the former platform 1 is no longer in place. The station building is connected to platforms 2 and 3 by a footbridge. The station has a "Midori no Madoguchi" staffed ticket office.

Platforms

Adjacent stations

History
The station opened on 5 October 1912. With the privatization of Japanese National Railways (JNR) on 1 April 1987, the station came under the control of JR Hokkaido.

Surrounding area
 National Route 39
 National Route 240
 National Route 243

See also
 List of railway stations in Japan

References

External links

 JR Hokkaido station information 

Railway stations in Hokkaido Prefecture
Railway stations in Japan opened in 1912